This is a list of members of the 6th Lok Sabha arranged by state or territory represented. These members of the lower house of the Indian Parliament were elected to the 6th Lok Sabha (1977 to 1980) at the 1977 Indian general election.

Andaman and Nicobar Islands

Andhra Pradesh

Arunachal Pradesh

Assam

Bihar

Chandigarh

Dadra and Nagar Haveli

Delhi

Goa, Daman and Diu

Gujarat

Haryana

Himachal Pradesh

Jammu and Kashmir

Jharkhand

Karnataka

Kerala

Lakshadweep

Madhya Pradesh

Maharashtra

Manipur

Meghalaya

Mizoram

Nagaland

Orissa

Puducherry

Punjab

Rajasthan

Sikkim

Tamil Nadu

Telangana

Tripura

Uttar Pradesh

West Bengal

References

List
6